Cornard may refer to:
Cornard Tye, a hamlet in Suffolk, England
Great Cornard, a village in Suffolk, England
Cornard United F.C., a football team from Great Cornard
Little Cornard, a village in Suffolk, England